The Cobboboonee National Park is a national park located in the Barwon South West region of Victoria, Australia.

Prior to its proclamation as a national park in November 2008, the area was formerly the Cobboboonee State Forest. The Lower Glenelg National Park is located to the west of the park and the Fitzroy River arises from the swamps within the park. Part of the course of the Great South West Walk is located within the park.

The Gunditjmara people are the traditional owners of the area containing the national park.

See also

 Protected areas of Victoria

References

National parks of Victoria (Australia)
Protected areas established in 2008
2008 establishments in Australia
Parks of Barwon South West (region)